The 2025 Rugby League World Cup qualification is the qualifying process which will decide the seven teams that would join the eight quarter-finalists from the 2021 World Cup and hosts France, who received an automatic spot, at the 2025 Rugby League World Cup. The process commenced in 2021, with the 2021 Rugby League European Championship D, which acted as the preliminary round for European qualification.

Background
The organisers announced in March 2022 that all eight countries that reach the quarter-finals of the 2021 competition will qualify for 2025 and another 27 countries will enter the qualifying tournament, with a total of 16 nations competing in the subsequent tournament. European countries will take between six and eight of the 16 places, Asia and Pacific region countries between five and seven, North and South American countries two places and Middle East and African countries one or two places. The Cook Islands were the only eligible member from the Asia-Pacific region who missed out on the 2021 Quarter Finals, and will have to qualify through the repechage.

Qualified teams 

Notes

Americas

First round

The 2022 South American Championship will act as a first round of the Americas qualification tournament. Despite participating in the tournament, Colombia is an observer nation, if they are to win the championship, the runner-up will go to the 2023 tournament.

Second round

The winners of the 2022 South American Championship Brazil will enter the 2023 Americas Championship along with the North American and Caribbean sides, United States, Jamaica and Canada, where the top two sides will qualify for the World Cup.

Europe

First round

The first round of European World Cup qualifiers began in 2021 under the European Championship D. The tournament saw the  progress to the second round of qualification.

Second round

 
The 2023 European Championship B will consist of the Czech Republic, Germany, Greece, Netherlands, Norway and Ukraine: Russia was originally part of the competition, but as they remained suspended due to the ongoing Russo-Ukrainian War, Czech Republic, the runners-up from 2021 Euro D, replaced them. 

The winners of each Group will go to the final round of qualification in 2024. 

Group A

Group B

Second round (cont.)

France and England have already qualified. An unknown number of teams will qualify directly from this competition, while further teams will join the top two teams from Championship B in the fourth round.

Group A

Group B

Third round

The winners of each group of the 2023 European Championship B will progress to the Europe Repêchage, along teams finishing second of each group of the 2023 European Championship A outside of France and England. These matches will take place in 2024.

Middle East-Africa

First round

The Middle East-Africa qualification process started with the 2022 MEA Rugby League Championship.

Second round

Nigeria and Ghana progressed to the 2023 MEA Cup where they will meet South Africa. As Lebanon qualified through making the 2021 World Cup quarter-finals, the highest-placed winner outside of Lebanon will play in an intercontinental play off.

Inter-regional Repêchage
The inter-regional Repêchage will feature the Cook Islands and the highest ranked side outside of Lebanon from the 2023 MEA Rugby League Cup in 2024.

Notes

References

2025 Rugby League World Cup
2021 in rugby league
2022 in rugby league
2023 in rugby league
2024 in rugby league